Dawn Run (1978–1986) was an Irish Thoroughbred racehorse (Deep Run - Twilight Slave) who was the most successful racemare in the history of National Hunt racing. She won the Champion Hurdle at the Cheltenham Festival in 1984 and the Cheltenham Gold Cup over fences at the festival in 1986. Dawn Run was the only racehorse ever to complete the Champion Hurdle - Gold Cup double. She was only the second mare to win the Champion Hurdle (and one of only four to win it in total), and one of only four who have won the Cheltenham Gold Cup. She was the only horse ever to complete the English, Irish and French Champion Hurdle treble.

Background
A daughter of the highly successful National Hunt sire Deep Run, Dawn Run was bought for 5,800 guineas and trained by Paddy Mullins in Ireland.

Racing career

Flat and Hurdle races
She started her career at the age of four, running in flat races at provincial courses. She was ridden in her first three races by her 62-year-old owner, Charmian Hill. After completing a hat-trick of wins on the flat, she set out on her hurdling career and progressed through the ranks to become champion novice hurdler in Britain and Ireland.

In her second season, she won eight of her nine races, including the English Champion Hurdle at Cheltenham, the Irish Champion Hurdle at Leopardstown, both over two miles, and the French Champion Hurdle (Grande Course de Haies d'Auteuil) at Auteuil over three miles, becoming the first horse to complete the treble. Her other big victories that season included the Christmas Hurdle (2 miles) at Kempton, in which she beat the reigning Champion Hurdler Gaye Brief by a neck after a duel up the home stretch, the Sandemans Hurdle at Aintree Racecourse (2 miles 5½ furlongs), which she won in a canter by fifteen lengths, and the Prix La Barka at Auteuil.

Steeplechases
She turned to steeplechasing but was injured after winning her first race and was out of action for the rest of the season. She made a successful return in December 1985 by winning the Durkan Brothers Chase at Punchestown by eight lengths. She followed up by beating the subsequent two mile champion chaser Buck House over two and a half miles at Leopardstown later the same month despite making a bad mistake at the last fence. She was a hot favourite to win that season's Cheltenham Gold Cup, despite the fact that no horse had ever completed the Champion Hurdle, Gold Cup double, she was still virtually a novice over fences, and the three and a quarter mile trip of the Gold Cup over the stiff Cheltenham course was further than she had ever run before. In January 1986, she was given a prep race at Cheltenham, which she was expected to win easily. Her usual jockey, Tony Mullins, the son of the trainer, was on board. As usual, she set out to make all the running but her inexperience showed as she made a mistake on the back straight and unshipped her jockey. The commentator Julian Wilson had just spent about 30 seconds effusively praising her performance, "cruising, coasting in the lead", "it's two years since she's been beaten". Mullins got back up on her and finished the course, last of the four runners. It was an unsatisfactory preparation for the Cheltenham Gold Cup, but, despite her inexperience, it was decided to let her take her chance.

Controversially, and against the wishes of the trainer, Tony Mullins was replaced for the Gold Cup by the top jockey of the time, Jonjo O'Neill. On the day, Dawn Run started hot favourite. O'Neill set her out in front to make the running as usual, but she was harried throughout the first circuit by Run and Skip. Unsettled by the attention, Dawn Run made a bad mistake at the water jump and lost two lengths and her momentum. She won back the lead at the next fence but made another bad mistake at the last ditch and was clearly under pressure as the field made their way down hill to the third last. At this stage, there were only four horses in contention: Dawn Run, Run and Skip, the previous year's Gold Cup winner Forgive ´n Forget, and Wayward Lad, who had won the King George VI Chase three times. As Dawn Run led the field into the straight with just two fences and the uphill finish ahead of them, a huge cheer went up from the crowd, but Wayward Lad and Forgive ´n Forget swept past the mare.  O'Neill drove her up to the second last and got such a response that she landed in front. It appeared to be a futile effort, however, as Wayward Lad regained the lead coming to the last fence, pressed by Forgive ´n Forget with Dawn Run struggling in third. About a hundred yards out, Wayward Lad began to hang to the left as his stamina started to give out. O'Neill switched Dawn Run to the outside, and they raced past Forgive ´n Forget and cut into Wayward Lad's lead. Yards from the finish, they caught him and passed the post three quarters of a length ahead. They had won in record time. The huge crowd then invaded the winners' enclosure to join in the celebrations.

In her next race at Aintree, Dawn Run failed to get past the first fence, but followed up by again beating Buck House in a specially arranged match over two miles at the Punchestown Festival. The decision was then made by her owner to send her back to France to try to repeat her 1984 win in the Grande Course de Haies d'Auteuil (French Champion Hurdle). French jockey Michel Chirol was on board Dawn Run. In that race, she fell while going well at a hurdle on the back straight, the fifth last, and never got up, having broken her neck. Her death at age eight, while barely into her prime as a steeplechaser, was hugely mourned by the racing public. It was reported on the front page of the following day's Irish Times, and her statue adorns the parade ring at Cheltenham, opposite the statue of Arkle.

Pedigree

See also
 List of historical horses

References

1978 racehorse births
1986 racehorse deaths
Cheltenham Festival winners
Champion Hurdle winners
Cheltenham Gold Cup winners
Racehorses trained in Ireland
Racehorses bred in Ireland
National Hunt racehorses
Thoroughbred family 6-f